Tall Chegah-e Sofla (also Romanized as  Tall Chegāh-e Soflá and Tal Chegāh-e Soflá; also known as Tal Chegāh-e Pā’īn, Tal Chekā-ye Pā’īn, and Tol Chegāh-e Pā’īn) is a village in Dorunak Rural District, Zeydun District, Behbahan County, Khuzestan Province, Iran. At the 2006 census, its population was 142, in 36 families.

References 

Populated places in Behbahan County